The Boynton and The Windsor are a pair historic buildings at 718 and 720 Main Street in Worcester, Massachusetts.  They are nearly identical brick apartment buildings that were constructed c. 1887 to designs by Barker & Nourse, and are well preserved instances of late 19th century apartment house construction that once lined Main Street for many blocks.  Of the two the Boynton (718 Main Street) is the better preserved, with an unaltered exterior.

The buildings were listed on the National Register of Historic Places in 1980.

See also
Wellington Street Apartment House District, a cluster of similar vintage apartment houses
National Register of Historic Places listings in southwestern Worcester, Massachusetts
National Register of Historic Places listings in Worcester County, Massachusetts

References

Apartment buildings on the National Register of Historic Places in Massachusetts
Buildings and structures completed in 1887
Buildings and structures in Worcester, Massachusetts
National Register of Historic Places in Worcester, Massachusetts